The 1983 PGA Tour season was played from January 6 to October 30. The season consisted of 43 official money golf tournaments. Seve Ballesteros, Jim Colbert, Mark McCumber, Gil Morgan, Calvin Peete, Hal Sutton, Lanny Wadkins, and Fuzzy Zoeller won the most tournaments, two, and there were 10 first-time winners. The tournament results, leaders, and award winners are listed below.

This was also the first season of the "All-Exempt Tour" which provided many more exemptions per year. For example, those that finished in the top 125 of the money list maintained full-time status rather than the top 60 which had been historic benchmark.

Schedule
The following table lists official events during the 1983 season.

Unofficial events
The following events were sanctioned by the PGA Tour, but did not carry official money, nor were wins official.

Money leaders
The money list was based on prize money won during the season, calculated in U.S. dollars.

Awards

Notes

References

External links
PGA Tour official site

PGA Tour seasons
PGA Tour